Events from the year 1774 in France

Incumbents
 Monarch – Louis XV (until 10 May), then Louis XVI

Events
10 May – Louis XV of France dies, and Louis XVI becomes the new king
Louis XVI faces empty treasury
division of three estates

Births
9 March – Louis Auguste Say, economist and businessman, founder of sugar refineries in Nantes and Paris (died 1840)

Deaths

4 February – Charles Marie de La Condamine, explorer, geographer, and mathematician (born 1701)
 24 April  – Sara Banzet, educator and diarist (b. 1745)
10 May – Louis XV, King of France and Navarre from 1715 (born 1710)
30 November – Nicolas-François Dupré de Saint-Maur, economist and statistician (born 1695)
16 December – François Quesnay, economist (born 1694)
29 December – Charles O'Brien, 7th Viscount Clare (born 1757)
 date unknown:
 Justine Paris, courtesan and madam (born 1705)
 Catherine Michelle de Maisonneuve, editor and writer

See also

References

1770s in France